Jean Friesen (born July 30, 1943) is a politician in Manitoba, Canada. She served in the Legislative Assembly of Manitoba for thirteen years, and was a member of New Democratic Premier Gary Doer's cabinet from 1999 to 2003.

Friesen was born in Oldham, Lancashire, in England, and moved to Canada at a young age. She was educated at McGill University and the University of British Columbia during the 1960s. Friesen was employed by the National Museum of Canada from 1967 to 1973, and has been a faculty member in the University of Manitoba's Department of History since that time. In 1991, she co-edited a work entitled Aboriginal Resource Use in Canada: Historical and Legal Aspects.

Friesen was first elected to the Manitoba legislature in the 1990 provincial election, defeating incumbent Liberal Harold Taylor by over one thousand votes in the central-Winnipeg riding of Wolseley. The election was won by the Progressive Conservatives, and Friesen joined nineteen other New Democrats in the official opposition. In the 1995 provincial election, she was re-elected for Wolseley in a landslide. Also in 1995, she supported Lorne Nystrom for the federal New Democratic Party leadership.

The NDP were victorious in the election of 1999, and Friesen again scored an easy victory in her own riding. She was appointed Deputy Premier of Manitoba and Minister of Intergovernment Affairs on October 5, 1999, also receiving ministerial responsibility for Cooperative Development on September 25, 2002. Also in 2002, she defended the provincial government's controversial decision to spray malathion in the Winnipeg area, as a means of controlling the city's insect population during an outbreak of West Nile fever.

In 2003, she supported Bill Blaikie's campaign to lead the federal New Democratic Party.

Friesen did not run for re-election in 2003, and formally stepped down from cabinet on June 25 of that year. She has subsequently returned to her teaching position at the University of Manitoba, and in 2004 issued a work entitled Magnificent Gifts: The Treaties of Canada with Indians of the Northwest, 1869-76.

References

1943 births
Living people
Members of the Executive Council of Manitoba
New Democratic Party of Manitoba MLAs
Canadian people of Norwegian descent
People from Oldham
Politicians from Winnipeg
English emigrants to Canada
Women MLAs in Manitoba
Deputy premiers of Manitoba
Women government ministers of Canada
McGill University alumni
University of British Columbia alumni
Academic staff of the University of Manitoba
21st-century Canadian politicians
21st-century Canadian women politicians